Vicenç Capdevila i Cardona (28 October 1936 – 21 March 2020) was a Spanish lawyer and politician.

Biography
He served as mayor of L'Hospitalet de Llobregat from 1973 to 1977; as Deputy of Congress from 1977 to 1979, representing Barcelona; as member parliament of Catalonia from 1980 to 1984, representing Barcelona.

He died on 21 March 2020, from COVID-19 during the COVID-19 pandemic in Spain at the age of 83.

References

1936 births
2020 deaths
Mayors of places in Catalonia
Members of the Parliament of Catalonia
Deaths from the COVID-19 pandemic in Spain
Members of the constituent Congress of Deputies (Spain)
People from L'Hospitalet de Llobregat
Union of the Democratic Centre (Spain) politicians
University of Deusto alumni